Cheryll Anne Tickle (born 18 January 1945)  is a distinguished British scientist, known for her work in developmental biology and specifically for her research into the process by which vertebrate limbs develop ab ovo. She is an Emeritus Professor at the University of Bath.

Education
Tickle was educated at the University of Cambridge graduating with a Master of Arts degree in 1967, and received her Ph.D. from the University of Glasgow in 1970.

Career and research
Tickle worked as a postdoctoral researcher at Yale University, as a lecturer and reader at the Middlesex Hospital Medical School, and (after Middlesex merged with it in 1987) a reader and professor at University College London. She then moved to the University of Dundee in 1998, where she became Foulerton Professor of the Royal Society in 2000, and moved again to the University of Bath in 2007, retaining the Foulerton Professor title.

Tickle's research in developmental biology investigates how single cells, the fertilised egg, gives rise to a new individual during embryogenesis.

As Tickle was nearing the end of her undergraduate career at the University of Cambridge, the concept of sorting-out was on the rise. Sorting-out or cell sorting is the phenomenon where cultured cells are disaggregated and then re-aggregated with the purpose of observing the reestablishment of the spatial organization of cell structures within a cell. 

Following the completion of her PhD in 1970, Tickle was given a NATO fellowship where she completed a postdoc in the United States working with John Philip Trinkaus at Yale University on cell sorting in fish embryos. After two years, Tickle moved back to London where she worked with Lewis Wolpert, who had been her PhD supervisor. At this time, she decided that she was going to focus on the effects of positional or pattern information on the sorting out process of cells during the limb development of chicken embryos. Tickle’s hypothesis was that if cells of the embryonic limb were to be given distinct characteristics in a random arrangement the cells would arrange themselves into a generated pattern or “sort out”.

In 1969, a scientist named John Saunders established that the apical ectodermal ridge (AER)--a transparent rim along limb buds--plays an important role in the development or outgrowth of a limb along with the zone of polarizing activity(ZPA). Using these findings, Tickle focused her research on how the ZPA controlled the development of the limb, specifically along the anterior and posterior axis of a developing limb as this axis is controlled by the signaling of the ZPA. 

It was at this time that Wolpert suggested that the ZPA produced morphogen to create a concentration gradient so that cells at varying positions along the limb bud would be exposed to different concentrations ultimately providing them with the information necessary to develop into the appropriate number of digits. In other words, he believed that the distance from the polarizing region would lead to the formation of different digits during limb development. Tickle’s experiments in his lab on embryonic chicken wings did find that the type of digit that developed did depend on its distance from the polarizing region. Cells closest to the polarizing region on the posterior side of the limb would come in contact with higher concentrations of morphogen to then form a chicken digit 4, whereas the cells furthest from the polarizing region on the anterior side of the limb would experience much lower concentrations and therefore develop the chicken digit 2. These results were important in the field of developmental biology at this time, as it suggested that this model would be a definitive way of understanding how the polarizing region or ZPA worked.

In 1976, Bruce Alberts, an American biochemist, brought the concept of using beads to further their research in the development of limbs. Together, they came up with the idea to soak the beads in extracts made from the polarizing region and then position them along the anterior margin of a developing chicken limb. There was also little known about what other chemicals were utilized during development, so the beads were soaked in many other substances thought to be significant, including insulin which was suggested to lead to duplication of limbs in ducks. In the early 1980’s, Tickle’s lab identified retinoic acid as a chemical that could mimic the signaling of the polarizing region by using carriers soaked in the retinoic acid.

By 1990, it was discovered that homologs of many developmentally important genes in vertebrates were found in Drosophila melanogaster and multiple scientists cloned chick homologs of these genes. Cheryll Tickle worked alongside Eddy De Robertis and Denis Duboule to look at Hox gene expression in developing limbs to relate it to chicken wing patterns. They found that if a limb was duplicated with retinoic acid, the pattern of Hox gene expression would also be copied.

Tickle also worked with Gail Martin and Lee Niswander in 1994 to find that fibroblast growth factors (FGF) are what is used by the apical ectodermal ridge for signaling. They also discovered that bone morphogenetic proteins (BMP) were involved in the polarizing region signaling. To test this, Tickle utilized the bead technology introduced by Bruce Alberts by using particular beads to apply various chemicals to developing limbs. When the ACR was removed and FGF soaked beads were substituted within a chick wing bud, it was found to be able to promote proper chicken wing development. This was a significant finding that led to further discovery of this concept within mice by Gail Martin on a more complex scale. A student in Tickle’s lab found that the placement of a bead soaked with FGF for only a few hours could induce the development of a new limb where one would not naturally form. It was concluded that FGF signaling must be turned off following the completion of limb development or else the organism risks additional digit formation and other abnormalities taking place.

Awards and honours
Tickle was elected  a Fellow of the Royal Society (FRS) in 1998, a Fellow of the Royal Society of Edinburgh (FRSE) in 2000, a Fellow of the Academy of Medical Sciences (FMedSci) in 2001, and a member of the European Molecular Biology Organisation in 2001. In 2004 the University of St. Andrews awarded her an honorary doctorate. In 2005 she was named a Commander of The Most Excellent Order of the British Empire (CBE). She also serves as a governor of the Caledonian Research Foundation. Her nomination for the Royal Society reads:

Personal life
Tickle married John Gray in 1979.

References

1945 births
20th-century British biologists
20th-century British women scientists
21st-century British biologists
21st-century British women scientists
Academics of the University of Bath
Academics of the University of Dundee
Academics of University College London
Alumni of Girton College, Cambridge
Alumni of the University of Glasgow
British women biologists
Fellows of the Academy of Medical Sciences (United Kingdom)
Fellows of the Royal Society
Fellows of the Royal Society of Edinburgh
Female Fellows of the Royal Society
Living people
Members of the European Molecular Biology Organization
Place of birth missing (living people)